The National Assembly of Soviets (TOGY) was the legislature of the Hungarian Soviet Republic. When the Soviet republic was overthrown in Hungary in August 1919, the Soviet Assembly was replaced by a unicameral parliament. The National Assembly of Soviets met only once between 14 and 23 June 1919. The assembly was initially made up of Bela Kun's communist Party of Communists in Hungary (KMP) and the social-democratic MSZDP, but the social-democrats abandoned the Assembly shortly after it formed.

Sources
 Hajdú Tibor: Választójog 1918–1919-ben, História, 1985/056
 Magyarország a XX. században I.: Politika és társadalom, hadtörténet, jogalkotás. Főszerk. Kollega Tarsoly István. Szekszárd: Babits. 1996. 43-48. o.
 A Magyarországi  Szocialista Szövetséges Tanácsköztársaság alkotmánya

Bibliography
 A Munkás-Katona-és Földmívestanácsok országos gyűlésének ügyrendje (Bp. 1919. www.ogyk.hu/e-konyvt/mpgy/hazszab.html)*
 A Tanácsok Országos Gyűlésének Naplója (Bp. 1919.)
 Hajdú Tibor: Tanácsok Magyarországon 1918-1919-ben (Bp. 1958.)
 Hajdú Tibor: A Tanácsok Országos Gyűlése. A Tanácsköztársaság alkotmánya (In: Magyarország története 1918-1919, 1919-1945. Főszerk.: Ránki György, szerk.: Hajdú Tibor és Tilkovszky Lóránt, Akadémiai Kiadó, Bp. 1978. Második kiadás, 319-321. oldal)
 Pecze Ferenc: A Tanácsok Országos Gyűlésének munkájából (In: Tanulmányok a Magyar Tanácsköztársaság államáról és jogáról, szerk.: Halász Pál, KJK, Bp. 1955. 5-56. oldal)
 Pecze Ferenc: Az országos gyűlés tárgyalási rendje különös tekintettel a küldöttek jogállására (In: A Magyar Tanácsköztársaság állama és joga. Szerk.: Sarlós Márton, Akadémiai Kiadó, Bp. 1959.)
 Pecze Ferenc: A Szövetségek Országos Gyűlésének megválasztása (In: Jogtörténeti tanulmányok III. Szerk.: Csizmadia Andor, KJK, Bp. 1974. 21-43. oldal)
 Révész T. Mihály: A szovjet típusú diktatúra első kísérlete: a Tanácsköztársaság (1919) (In: Magyar alkotmánytörténet, 447-462. oldal)
 Sarlós Márton: A Magyar Tanácsköztársaság állama és joga (Bp. 1959.)
 Szentpéteri István: A tanácsok megalakulása és jogi szabályozása a Tanácsköztársaságban (Szeged, 1957.)
 Szentpéteri István: A Magyar Tanácsköztársaság megalakulása és a tanácsok (Jogtudományi Közlöny, 1958. 3-4. szám)

Hungary, Soviet National Assembly
1919 establishments in Hungary
1919 disestablishments